Mountain Television is a news channel of Nepal which was launched in 2009. Its headquarters is situated in Kathmandu, Nepal. Mountain Television is the nation's first popular and leading analytical news channel, with bureaus inside and outside Nepal.

Mountain TV is owned & operated by Padma Group, – one of Nepal’s leading media corporations with a portfolio of three satellite televisions including Bhaktidarshan International TV broadcasting spiritual, religious content & Business Plus TV broadcasting economic & business related issues.

Programs
 Mission News 
 Mountain Focus 
 Mountain Sambad
 Urja Bahas 
 Biz Talk 
 Shikshya Sarokar 
 Mountain Health Desk

References

Television channels in Nepal
Television channels and stations established in 2010
2009 establishments in Nepal